Gwynedd is a large rural county in North Wales. The northern half includes the high mountains of Snowdonia and the mixed farmland and hills of the Llŷn Peninsula, which between them make up the historic county of Caernarvonshire. The southern part of Gwynedd is the softer coastal and upland landscapes of the historic county of Merionethshire. Gwynedd, the second-largest county in Wales, has a total of 497 scheduled monuments. That is too many to have on a single list article, so for convenience the list is divided into three.  The 171 prehistoric sites in historic Merionethshire (shown below), the 194 prehistoric sites in historic Caernarvonshire, and the 132 Roman to modern sites across the whole of Gwynedd. Over the whole of Gwynedd, there are 139 burial sites (67 on this list), including chambered tombs, cairns, mounds and barrows, dating from the Neolithic, Bronze Age, and Iron Age. A further 167 sites are 'domestic' (64 on this list), mostly Iron Age hut circles and enclosures. As well as several field systems, there are 47 defensive sites (20 on this list) such as hillforts and promentary forts, again from the Iron Age. Gwynedd is a unitary authority comprising most of the two historic counties. In 1974 it also merged with Anglesey, and the merged county was also called Gwynedd. Since 1996 Anglesey has been a separate county again.

The northern prehistoric sites are listed at List of prehistoric scheduled monuments in Gwynedd (former Caernarvonshire).
 
All 132 Roman, early medieval, medieval and modern sites for the whole of Gwynedd are listed at List of Roman-to-modern scheduled monuments in Gwynedd.

Scheduled monuments have statutory protection. It is illegal to disturb the ground surface or any standing remains. The compilation of the list is undertaken by Cadw Welsh Historic Monuments, which is an executive agency of the National Assembly of Wales. The list of scheduled monuments below is supplied by Cadw with additional material from RCAHMW and Gwynedd Archaeological Trust.

List

See also
List of Cadw properties
List of castles in Wales
List of hill forts in Wales
Historic houses in Wales
List of monastic houses in Wales
List of museums in Wales
List of Roman villas in Wales

References
Coflein is the online database of RCAHMW: Royal Commission on the Ancient and Historical Monuments of Wales, GAT is the Gwynedd Archaeological Trust, Cadw is the Welsh Historic Monuments Agency

Gwynedd
Buildings and structures in Gwynedd
Prehistoric sites in Wales